Javier Fernández-Rozada Álvarez (born 3 July 1982), known as Javi Rozada, is a Spanish football manager.

Managerial career
Born in Oviedo, Asturias, Rozada graduated in law but started his career in 2006 as CD Covadonga's Alevín B manager. He subsequently worked at the youth categories of the Asturias autonomous team and Real Oviedo before being appointed manager of Tercera División side CD Lealtad in June 2013.

Rozada achieved promotion to Segunda División B in his first season in charge, and managed to stay in the category in the following two campaigns. On 3 May 2016, he announced his departure from the club, and spent a year unemployed before taking over Real Oviedo Vetusta on 10 July 2017.

On 5 June 2018, after another promotion to division three, Rozada renewed with the Carbayones for a further two years, and took the club to their best-ever position in 2018–19. On 15 September 2019, he was named at the helm of the main squad in Segunda División, replacing fired Sergio Egea.

Rozada's first professional match in charge occurred on 19 September 2019, a 1–1 home draw against Extremadura UD. The following 18 February, as the team fell into the relegation places, he was replaced by José Ángel Ziganda.

On 3 August 2020, Rozada was appointed as the new manager of Segunda División B side Racing Santander, who had just been relegated from the Segunda División.

Managerial statistics

Honours

Manager
CD Lealtad
Tercera División: 2013–14

Real Oviedo B
Tercera División: 2017–18

References

External links
 
 

1982 births
Living people
Sportspeople from Oviedo
Spanish football managers
Segunda División managers
Segunda División B managers
Real Oviedo Vetusta managers
Real Oviedo managers
Racing de Santander managers